

The Comte AC-8 was a 1930s Swiss six-seat light transport aircraft produced by Flugzeugbau A. Comte.

Design and development
Similar in configuration to the company's earlier Comte AC-4, the Comte AC-8 was designed as a light transport for five passengers. It incorporated a braced high-wing monoplane wing, with a conventional tail unit and fixed tailwheel landing gear. The enclosed cabin had accommodation for a pilot and five passengers. The aircraft was powered by either a Wright J-6 or Lorraine radial engine.

Only three aircraft were built.

Specifications

References

See also

1930s Swiss civil utility aircraft
AC-8
Single-engined tractor aircraft